Ronaldo Fonseca de Souza (born 4 April 1959 in Volta Redonda) is a Brazilian lawyer and politician, member of the Podemos (PODE). He was elected Federal Deputy from Distrito Federal in 2010, and was appointed by president Michel Temer as Secretary-General of the Presidency of Brazil. Fonseca is also a pastor of the Assembleias de Deus church.

Political career
In December 2013, deputy Ronaldo Fonseca defended the reduction of taxes in Brazil. Ronaldo is author of a proposal of amendment of the Constitution which extend tax immunity of churches, political parties, and other institutions.

In 2015, Ronaldo supported the reduction of criminal majority, along with resocialization.

In 2016, was reporter, in the Chamber of Deputies' Ethics Council, of an appeal of deputy Eduardo Cunha, denounced in the Operation Car Wash and who had a voting favorable for his removal from the Chamber. Considered Cunha's ally, Fonseca presented a 69 pages report asking for a new voting.

In August 2017, voted for the rejection of the denounce of passive corruption against president Temer, which approval rating was the worse since the military dictatorship. On 28 May 2018, took office as new Secretary-General of the Presidency of the government Michel Temer.

References

External links
 Official website

1959 births
Living people
20th-century Brazilian lawyers
People from Volta Redonda
Brazilian Assemblies of God pastors
Government ministers of Brazil
Members of the Chamber of Deputies (Brazil) from the Federal District
Podemos (Brazil) politicians
Republican Party of the Social Order politicians
Liberal Party (Brazil, 2006) politicians
Social Christian Party (Brazil) politicians
Progressistas politicians